Spy Hard is a 1996 American spy parody film starring Leslie Nielsen (who also executive produced) and Nicollette Sheridan, parodying James Bond and other action films.  The introduction to the film is sung by comedy artist "Weird Al" Yankovic, and it was the first film to be written by Jason Friedberg and Aaron Seltzer who later went on to co-write Scary Movie and write and direct parody films such as Date Movie, Disaster Movie, and Meet the Spartans. The film's title is a parody of Die Hard. The film was directed by Rick Friedberg who produced with Doug Draizin and Jeffrey Konvitz.

The film was released by Buena Vista Pictures under its Hollywood Pictures banner on May 24, 1996, receiving negative reviews from critics. While many praised Nielsen's acting and its humor, most found the script, story, and its direction disappointing. The film eventually grossed $26 million against a production budget of $18 million.

Plot 
Secret agent WD-40 Dick Steele has his work cut out for him. Along with the mysterious and lovely Veronique Ukrinsky, Agent 3.14, he must rescue the kidnapped Barbara Dahl and stop the evil genius, a General named Rancor, from seizing control of the entire world.

Rancor was wounded in an earlier encounter and no longer has arms. However, he can "arm" himself by attaching robotic limbs with various weapons attached. Steele is approached by an old friend, agent Steven Bishop, who unsuccessfully tries to recruit him out of retirement. However, when a news report Steele is watching reveals that Bishop has been killed, Steele returns to the agency. Steele given his new assignment by The Director, who also is testing out a variety of elaborate disguises. At headquarters, Steele encounters an old agency nemesis, Norm Coleman, and flirts with the Director's adoring secretary, referred to as Miss Cheevus.

On the job, Steele is assisted by an agent named Kabul, who gives him rides in a never-ending variety of specially designed cars. They seek help from McLuckey, a blond child left home alone, who is very good at fending off intruders. Steele resists the temptations of a dangerous woman he finds waiting for him in bed. But he does work very closely with Agent 3.14, whose father, Professor Ukrinsky is also being held captive by Rancor.

Everything comes to an explosive conclusion at the General's remote fortress, where Steele rescues both Barbara Dahl and Miss Cheevus and launches a literally disarmed Rancor into outer space, saving mankind.

Cast

Production

Title sequence 
"Weird Al" Yankovic sings the title song and directed the title sequence. It is a parody of title sequences from the James Bond films designed by Maurice Binder, specifically 1965's Thunderball, complete with multiple coloured backgrounds, silhouetted figures, women dancing with guns, and "wavy" text. Additionally, an urban legend states that during the recording of the theme to Thunderball, Tom Jones held the song's final note long enough to pass out. Yankovic holds it so long that his head explodes. Originally, Yankovic had planned to loop the note to the required length, but in the studio, he discovered he was able to hold the note long enough that no looping was required. The sequence was later included on "Weird Al" Yankovic: The Ultimate Video Collection, although, for legal reasons, all credits and titles had to be taken out, excluding that of the film and of Yankovic himself.

Release

Box office 
The film opened at #3 with $10,448,420 behind Mission: Impossibles opening weekend and Twisters third. It eventually grossed $26,960,191 at the box office.

Reception

Critical response
On Rotten Tomatoes, the film holds an approval rating of 7% based on 41 reviews, and an average rating of 3.6/10. The site's critics consensus states: "Leslie Nielsen's comic gifts are undisputed, but Spy Hards lazy script and slapdash direction fail to take advantage of them." On Metacritic, the film has a weighted average score of 25 out of 100, based on 13 critics, indicating "generally unfavorable reviews". Audiences surveyed by CinemaScore gave the film a grade of "C+" on an A+ to F scale.

James Berardinelli of ReelViews wrote: "Director Rick Friedberg [...] has crafted a dreadfully unfunny comedy that takes Naked Gun-like sketches and rehashes them without a whit of style or energy. ... For movie-after-movie, Leslie Nielsen has milked this same personality, and it's starting to wear very thin. As affable as the actor is, there's just nothing left in this caricature. However, while Spy Hard might have worked better with, say, Roger Moore in the title role (his 007 was a parody towards the end, anyway), Nielsen's performance is only a small part of a massively-flawed production. Hard is the operative word here, because, even at just eighty-one minutes, this movie is unbelievably difficult to sit through."

Stephen Holden of The New York Times wrote: "Spy Hard is never funnier than during its opening credit sequence in which "Weird Al" Yankovic bellows his parody of the brassy theme song from Goldfinger, while obese cartoon silhouettes swim across the screen. ... Instead of building sustained comic set pieces, it takes a machine-gun approach to humor. Without looking at where it's aiming, it opens fire and sprays comic bullets in all directions, trusting that a few will hit the bull's-eye. A few do, but many more don't. ... Around the halfway point, Spy Hard begins to run out of ideas and becomes a series of crude, rambunctious parodies of other films. ... When Spy Hard abruptly ends after only 81 minutes, you sense that it has used up every last round of available ammunition. It was simply exhausted and couldn't move another inch."

Mick LaSalle of San Francisco Chronicle wrote: "It's done in the style of the Zucker-Abrahams-Zucker Naked Gun series, but although the style is there, the jokes aren't. Spy Hard relies on silly slapstick, takeoffs of recent films and the shock effect of celebrity cameos. But all that exertion doesn't add up to more than a handful of laughs. ... The story is too weak to work even as a clothesline for gags. Spy Hard eschews a coherent story and instead just strings together movie takeoffs. ... Nielsen, with his expert deadpan and sense of comic timing, creates the illusion of humor – for about 15 minutes. Thanks to him, what could have been an unbearable experience becomes merely empty. Still, he can't work miracles, and nothing short of a miracle could have made Spy Hard worth seeing."

Stephen Hunter of The Baltimore Sun gave the film a negative review, writing that the film is "more of a parody of a parody than a parody" and in particular criticizing director Rick Friedberg, asking, "[w]as this poor guy ever funny?"

Marcia Gay Harden wasn't a fan of the film itself as well:

See also
 "Spy Hard" (song)

References

External links

 
 
 
 
 

1996 films
American crime comedy films
American parody films
American spy comedy films
Films scored by Bill Conti
Hollywood Pictures films
American slapstick comedy films
1990s spy comedy films
1990s parody films
Parody films based on James Bond films
1996 comedy films
Films directed by Rick Friedberg
1990s English-language films
1990s American films